Monte San Pietrangeli is a comune (municipality) in the Province of Fermo in the Italian region Marche, located about  south of Ancona and about  north of Ascoli Piceno.

Among its churches is the Neoclassical style church of Santi Lorenzo e Biagio.

References

Cities and towns in the Marche